T.I.N.T. (an acronym for This Is Not The Album) is a mixtape by Ghanaian singer Efya. It was released on November 11, 2013, by One Nation Entertainment. The mixtape was made available for free digital download and features a guest appearance from Black Magic. It was supported by the singles "Getaway" and "Best In Me". In addition to consisting of songs released between 2011 and 2013, the mixtape also consists of songs that did not make Janesiss final track listing. T.I.N.T. was made available for purchase on January 1, 2014 on iTunes.

Composition
T.I.N.T. embodies elements of neo soul, jazz and R&B. "A Moments Notice" is a song with a soul-inspired theme. In the Latin-inspired track "This Life", Efya explores her vocal range. In "Little Things", she talks about silly things that people do when they become complacent with their significant other. In "Nothing", Efya mixes her native dialect Twi with Yoruba. "Falou" is a cover of Duncan Mighty's single "Obianuju". In "Weather 4 Two," Efya sings about the feeling people get from making love to their significant other. In an interview posted on the Modern Ghana website, she described the song as a slow sensual cuddle song. "Body" is a cover of Chris Brown's "Don't Judge Me"; it addresses the media's impingement into her life. The Black Magic-assisted track "Commot" is a blend of soul and jazz.

Singles
The mixtape's lead single "Getaway" was released on November 10, 2011. The accompanying music video for the song was shot and directed in and around Accra by Sony Addo. Efya released the mixtape's second single "Best In Me" on February 14, 2012. The OJ Films-directed visuals for "Best In Me" was uploaded to YouTube on September 20, 2013; Ghanaian rapper Sarkodie played Efya's love interest in the video.

Critical reception
T.I.N.T. received generally positive reviews from music critics. Ayomide Tayo of Nigerian Entertainment Today awarded the mixtape 4 stars out of 5, characterizing it as "a soulful blend of songs mixed with West African sensibilities". Tayo also said it is "filled with layered and soulful production which doesn't overshadow Efya's rich voice."

Track listing

Personnel
Jane Awindor – primary artist, songwriter
Black Magic – featured artist

Release history

References

2013 mixtape albums
Efya albums